Veranke is a fictional character appearing in American comic books published by Marvel Comics. She serves as the queen of the Skrull Empire. Introduced as Jessica Drew, Veranke is the main antagonist of Secret Invasion, in which she leads her empire to invade and conquer Earth.

Auden and Harriet L. Ophuls portrayed young Veranke in the Marvel Cinematic Universe (MCU) film Captain Marvel (2019), depicted as the daughter of Talos and Soren.

Publication history
Veranke's first appearance is a cameo appearance as a cloaked figure in Secret Invasion #1. Her character is named and fleshed out in New Avengers #40 as she is seen rising to the Skrull throne.

Although the "Spider-Woman" appearing in New Avengers #1 is actually Veranke in disguise, this is not revealed until some time later.

Fictional character biography
After the group of Earth superheroes known as the Illuminati escape from the Skrull palace, Emperor Dorrek VII is scolded by princess Veranke from the Tyeranx 7 province, for not heeding the words of the Skrull prophecies, which state the attack upon the palace, then the Skrull homeworld's destruction, the coming of a "wave of devastation" through Skrull space, and the need to take "a world of blue" as their new home. As Dorrek VII ignores her warnings, Veranke declares if Dorrek VII is unable to heed the writings of the Skrull's scriptures and the Skrull people's will, Dorrek VII should be removed from the throne. For her defiance, Dorrek VII banishes Veranke to a prison planet, brushing her off as an insane fanatic and a traitor while acknowledging executing her would only turn her into a martyr for her cause.

Planning the Secret Invasion

Years later, the Skrull throneworld is destroyed by Galactus, the next prophecy fulfilled, the Skrulls elevate Veranke (still on the prison world) to the throne of the Skrull Empire. As Queen, Veranke declares that the scriptures foretell Earth as the Skrull's new homeland. As such, the Skrulls undergo a major operation to take over Earth through infiltrating Earth's facets, thereby weakening Earth enough to employ a military invasion to conquer the planet. In addition, Veranke decides to be one of the agents, deciding to play a direct part in Earth's infiltration. When she asks who among the candidates for replacement is most capable of inflicting damage, Spider-Woman (Jessica Drew) is recommended as the prime choice.

Impersonating Spider-Woman
When the real Spider-Woman went undercover into HYDRA to regain lost powers, Spider-Woman was placed under sedation by Skrulls posing as HYDRA agents, and replaced by Veranke taking Spider-Woman's place as a double agent of S.H.I.E.L.D. director Nick Fury.

As "Spider-Woman", Veranke is appointed to working at the Raft, and was at the Raft when Electro unleashed a mass break-out attempt of the prisoners inside. This event unintentionally led to the New Avengers's reformation, which she later joins after Captain America (Steve Rogers) offers membership to "Spider-Woman". Fury instructs her to continue as a personal agent, now within the New Avengers, S.H.I.E.L.D., and HYDRA simultaneously; she eventually confesses this triple agent arrangement to the Avengers.

During an adventure with the New Avengers, Veranke learns of her rule's greatest threat: Dorrek VIII, also known as Hulkling of the Young Avengers and the son of the Kree hero Captain Marvel and the Skrull princess Anelle who is a likely heir to the throne. During the invasion, she orders Dorrek VIII to be executed, keeping the identity a secret.

House of M
During the House of M, it was revealed that Veranke, along with all the other undercover Skrulls, knew that the world had been altered. She tries to assassinate the Scarlet Witch, but is unsuccessful and deconstructed in a way similar to Hawkeye (Clint Barton); both come back afterward. In the aftermath, news reaches her that the Skrull Empire itself has almost entirely been destroyed by the Annihilation Wave, killing billions of Skrulls, further fulfilling their prophecies. Distressed, Veranke and her agents are more determined to continue their takeover of Earth.

Civil War
Soon after the identity of Spider-Man (Peter Parker) is revealed to the world during the Civil War storyline, Iron Man (Tony Stark) discloses her triple agent status to acting S.H.I.E.L.D. director Maria Hill. Troubled by her potentially treasonous allegiance to Fury, Hill orders "Spider-Woman" apprehended. Hiding under the name Sybil Dvorak, she is captured and taken aboard a S.H.I.E.L.D. helicarrier. Deploying an electro-magnetic pulse device, a HYDRA commando team disables the helicarrier and rescues her. She makes her way to the hidden base of Captain America's Secret Avengers and tearfully pleads to join the resistance, having lost her connection to S.H.I.E.L.D. and Fury.

After the Civil War, Veranke travels alongside the New Avengers to Tokyo, fighting Elektra - also a Skrull impostor - and the Hand, and is unable to prevent Echo from killing Elektra which reveals the Skrull infiltration. As the New Avengers ponders the next move, Veranke attacks Wolverine and takes the Skrull corpse. She delivers the corpse to Iron Man in a move designed to sow distrust amongst the superhero community, which at this point is not difficult as there is already a great deal of distrust on all sides of the superhero community due to the Civil War and its aftermath, leaving bad feelings on many fronts. Afterwards, she also joins the government sanctioned Mighty Avengers, under the guise of throwing the Skrulls off balance.

Secret Invasion

During the Secret Invasion storyline, "Jessica Drew" is informed of the crash-landing of a Skrull transport ship in the Savage Land. Unbeknownst to Stark, she in turn tips off Luke Cage about this information, saying that she trusts Cage over Stark. A meeting among the Skrull agents on Earth is held where Veranke is apparently in attendance, referred to as "Empress" by the Skrull posing as Edwin Jarvis.

After the first wave of the Skrull invasion of Earth begins, Veranke is seen in the Savage Land, where she confronts and attacks Echo, repeatedly blasting with venom blasts and then slamming her opponent into a nearby tree trunk. She then finds Iron Man who she insinuates is a Skrull sleeper agent, which Iron Man denies. She kisses Iron Man, informing Iron Man of having "earned the queen's love". Black Widow plans to attack while Veranke talks to Iron Man, but is distracted by Skrulls posing as Beast and Jean Grey, and Veranke disappears and escapes while Black Widow kills the Skrulls.

Queen Veranke arrives at Camp Hammond and the Shadow Initiative attempt to assassinate her. Thor's presence is known and she assembles her troops for the final battle. The New Avengers, Mighty Avengers, Nick Fury's commandos, the Young Avengers, the Initiative, the Hood's crew, Thor, Captain America (Bucky Barnes), and the Thunderbolts all assemble. Queen Veranke later reveals that "He", a figure mentioned repeatedly by Skrulls throughout the storyline in the phrase 'he loves you' is a reference to "God" as she leads an army of Super-Skrulls against the superhumans of Earth. During the fight, Wolverine confronts Veranke and a fight begins. Wolverine quickly gains the upper hand and impales Veranke through the shoulder with claws. Moments later, Young Avenger Hawkeye (Kate Bishop) is injured, prompting Ronin (Clint Barton) to pick up the bow. Ronin then kills four Skrulls before seemingly killing Veranke with a shot to the head. This leads to the Skrull posing as Hank Pym to activate the device inside the Wasp's body, which Pym says will end it all. Wasp starts growing to enormous size, but Thor transports Wasp to another dimension to die. Veranke, however, is revealed to be still alive. Just as many of the heroes go to attack, Norman Osborn shoots Veranke in the head, killing the Skrull Queen.

After death
During the "Dark Reign" storyline, Veranke is seen in Erebus when Hercules travels to the Underworld where she is among those either gambling or lingering for their resurrection. She is later seen in Pluto's jury at Zeus's trial.

Resurrection
It is revealed that Osborn had been preserving Veranke's body secretly under Wilson Fisk's orders. Once the "Devil's Reign" event occurs almost a decade later, Veranke is revived and being set loose by Mayor Wilson Fisk so she can get revenge on Jessica Drew. While still having Spider-Woman's abilities, she is still off due to how long she was kept imprisoned by Osborn. Despite some difficulty, Spider-Woman defeats Veranke and has Captain Marvel place her somewhere secure on a garbage scow.

Powers and abilities
Like all Skrulls of Deviant heritage, Veranke is capable of shape-shifting her form into whatever she chooses, be it humanoid, non-humanoid, or even inorganic. Recent unspecified developments in genetic engineering within the Skrull race has allowed the Skrulls, including Veranke to go undetected in human form from Iron Man's technological scans, Charles Xavier's mental scans, Spider-Man's Spider-Sense, Wolverine's animal senses, or any other conceivable forms of detection. So subtle and powerful is this form of concealment neither Doctor Strange at his Sanctum Sanctorum could detect her with the Spell of Tartashi (though it apparently inflicted some degree of physical pain), nor could the Elder God-powered Scarlet Witch using Xavier's psychic powers delve into Veranke's true mind, as shown when Veranke was granted Jessica Drew's desires, not her own. Veranke's shape-shifting abilities also allow her to form weapons such as blades on her body. Veranke also has a great deal of knowledge concerning Skrull prophecies.

While posing as Jessica Drew, she displayed Spider-Woman's powers which include:

 Flight
 Superhuman strength, endurance, reflexes, and speed.
 Bioelectric Energy Blasts "venom blasts"
 Immunity to all poisons and drugs, and is totally immune to radiation.
 Pheromones generation to attract human males while repulsing females, though she uses a chemical "perfume" that can nullify this effect. Recently emerged with her powers restored greater than ever.

As Jessica Drew, she initially had only limited gliding ability, enhanced by the small wings that are part of her costume. After losing her powers, HYDRA further tampered with her metabolism, providing her with self-powered flight. The range of her flying capabilities is still undetermined. She displayed powers that helped her and the other Avengers escape from Doctor Doom's technological device by creating a Venom blast explosion — this use of Spider-Woman's powers was noted as inconsistent with her S.H.I.E.L.D. files.

Other versions
During the Secret Wars storyline, the Battleworld domain of the Warzone (which is based on a reality in which the Superhuman Civil War never ended), Queen Veranke is the cause of every single failed attempt at reaching peace in a part of a plan to benefit from the never-ending war. This was revealed to President Stark when he was captured by Queen Veranke's men posing as Black Panther's soldiers. President Stark used weapons not in his armor to free himself and She-Hulk from Queen Veranke's clutches.

In other media
 Veranke appears in The Avengers: Earth's Mightiest Heroes, voiced by Elizabeth Daily. This incarnation poses as Mockingbird while orchestrating the Skrull invasion of Earth, only to be defeated by the Avengers and incarcerated at Prison 42.
 Veranke is a playable character in the video game Marvel Avengers: Battle for Earth, voiced by Mary Elizabeth McGlynn.

Marvel Cinematic Universe
Veranke appears in live-action media set in the Marvel Cinematic Universe (MCU).
Veranke is introduced as a child in the film Captain Marvel, portrayed primarily by Auden and Harriet L. Ophuls. This version is the daughter of Talos and Soren, and is among the Skrull refugees stranded on a space station whom Danvers escorts to safety.

References

External links
 

Characters created by Brian Michael Bendis
Comics characters introduced in 2005
Fictional dictators
Fictional mass murderers
Fictional queens
Marvel Comics extraterrestrial supervillains
Marvel Comics female supervillains
S.H.I.E.L.D. agents
Skrull
Spider-Woman